The Royal Australian and New Zealand College of Psychiatrists (RANZCP) is the principal organisation representing the medical specialty of psychiatry in Australia and New Zealand and has responsibility for training, examining and awarding the qualification of Fellowship of the College (FRANZCP) to medical practitioners.

About
There are currently more than 4000 Fellows of the College  who account for approximately 85 per cent of all practising psychiatrists in Australia and over 50 per cent of psychiatrists in New Zealand. Over 1000 trainees are undertaking basic and advanced training to become psychiatrists in both countries.

The Royal Australian and New Zealand College of Psychiatrists is a collegial community of medical specialists and trainees committed to the following core purposes:
 Preparation of medical specialists in the field of psychiatry
 Support and enhancement of clinical practice
 Influence and leadership across the mental health sector.

The Royal Australian and New Zealand College of Psychiatrists's vision:

To enhance the mental health of our nations through leadership in high-quality psychiatric care.

History
The Australasian Association of Psychiatrists was formed on 9 October 1946. In 1962, the association resolved to "take the necessary action forthwith to convert the association into a college". and the Australian and New Zealand College of Psychiatrists was officially incorporated in Sydney on 28 October 1963. The Australasian Association of Psychiatrists was officially dissolved at a special general meeting in Melbourne on 12 April 1964. The first formal meeting of the council of the new College took place in Canberra on 25 October 1964. The meeting coincided with the College’s first annual congress.

The RANZCP was granted the Royal prefix with effect from May 1978. An extraordinary meeting of the College ratified the inclusion of "Royal" in the College’s name on 7 May 1978.

Menders of the Mind, published by Oxford University Press, commemorated the 50th anniversary of The Royal Australian and New Zealand College of Psychiatry.

Governance
The RANZCP is governed by a board of democratically elected directors, led by the college president.

The board governs according to the RANZCP Constitution

The college comprises branches in each state and territory of Australia, and New Zealand. Its governance structure also includes faculties, sections and networks.

Faculties
 Addiction Psychiatry
 Adult Psychiatry
 Child and Adolescent Psychiatry
 Consultation–Liaison Psychiatry
 Forensic Psychiatry
 Psychiatry of Old Age
 Psychotherapy

Sections
 Child and Adolescent Forensic Psychiatry
 Early Career Psychiatrists
 Electroconvulsive Therapy and Neurostimulation
 History, Philosophy and Ethics of Psychiatry
 Leadership and Management
 Neuropsychiatry
 Perinatal and Infant Psychiatry
 Private Practice Psychiatry
 Psychiatry of Intellectual and Developmental Disabilities
 Rural Psychiatry
 Social and Cultural Psychiatry
 Youth Mental Health

Networks
 Family Violence Psychiatry Network
 Military and Veterans' Mental Health Network
 Asylum Seeker and Refugee Mental Health Network

Activities
The RANZCP:
 Conducts a training and examinations process for qualification as a consultant psychiatrist
 Administers a continuing professional development programme for practising professionals
 Holds an annual scientific congress and various sectional conferences throughout the year
 Supports continuing medical education activities at a regional level
 Publishes a range of journals, statements and other policy documents
 Liaises with government, allied professionals and community groups in the interests of psychiatrists, patients and the general community

RANZCP Publications
The RANZCP publishes:
 Two journals: the Australian and New Zealand Journal of Psychiatry and Australasian Psychiatry.(http://informahealthcare.com/loi/anp; http://informahealthcare.com/loi/apy)
 Consumer and carer treatment guides for Australia and New Zealand covering Anorexia nervosa, Bipolar disorder, Depression, Panic disorder, Schizophrenia and Self-harm. (https://web.archive.org/web/20100519014418/http://www.ranzcp.org/resources/clinical-practice-guidelines.html)
 A variety of position statements, clinical memoranda and practice and ethical guidelines pertaining to the practice of psychiatry to inform practitioners and the general public of issues that may impact upon the practice of psychiatry across Australia and New Zealand.  (https://web.archive.org/web/20100608155208/http://www.ranzcp.org/resources/statements-guidelines.html)
 A Strategic Plan details the RANZCP’s vision, purposes, values and ethical principles, and strategic and operational priorities for 2009–2011.(https://web.archive.org/web/20100528023444/http://www.ranzcp.org/publications/ranzcp-strategic-plan.html)
 Annual reports of the RANZCP are available on the College website. (https://web.archive.org/web/20100528023038/http://www.ranzcp.org/publications/annual-reports.html)
 RANZCP media releases are available on the College website.(http://www.ranzcp.org/media/maintaining-our-profile.html)

Events
The RANZCP holds several events, general psychiatry and mental health conferences.(https://web.archive.org/web/20100706223050/http://www.ranzcp.org/resources/events.html)

Training
The first step in becoming a psychiatrist is to undertake medical training at university and qualify as a doctor. The next step is to complete a 12-month period of intern training in a general hospital in order to become a fully registered medical practitioner and gain experience in specialist aspects of medicine and surgery. After this, interested doctors are eligible to apply for entry to the Psychiatric Training Programme, although some doctors choose to extend their general medical training before applying. Careful selection of psychiatric Trainees is conducted by a panel of psychiatrists who interview applicants in each Australian State and in New Zealand. Applicants must also provide extensive references regarding their work performance and suitability for psychiatric training. Those applicants who successfully progress through this process and satisfy all the criteria will be offered a place on the Training Programme.

Training requires mandatory supervision by experienced, qualified psychiatrists and is undertaken in approved training hospitals/services. In Australia and New Zealand, specialist postgraduate psychiatric training is conducted by the RANZCP. Training takes a minimum of five years to complete, during which time trainees work as registrars under supervision in hospitals and community clinics. They gain wide experience in dealing with the full range of psychiatric problems, including those of children and families, adults and the elderly.

Notable Fellows (FRANZCP)
 Prof David Ames AO
 Prof. Marie Bashir, AC, CVO
 Prof. Sir Mason Durie, KNZM, FRSNZ, FHCNZ
 Prof. Christos Pantelis, FRCP
 Dr. Ainslie Meares
 Dr. John Cade, AO (President, 1969–70)
 Dr. Eric Cunningham Dax, AO, FRACP
 Dr. Felice Lieh-mak, CBE, JP, FRCP
 Dr. John Diamond

See also
 List of Australian organisations with royal patronage
 Royal College of Psychiatrists
 Royal College of Physicians and Surgeons of Canada
 American Psychiatric Association
 Hong Kong College of Psychiatrists

References

External links
 Royal Australian and New Zealand College of Psychiatrists

Medical education in Australia
Specialist medical colleges in Australia
Medical education in New Zealand
Australian and New Zealand Psychiatrists
Medical associations based in Australia
Organisations based in Australia with royal patronage
Psychiatric associations
Mental health organisations in Australia
Medical associations based in New Zealand
Organisations based in New Zealand with royal patronage
1946 establishments in Australia
Mental health organisations in New Zealand